The Seregno–Bergamo railway is a railway line in Lombardy, Italy.

History 
The line was opened in two sections: from Seregno to Carnate on 24 September 1888, and from Carnate to Ponte San Pietro on 1 July 1889 with the completion of the San Michele Bridge across the Adda River. From Ponte San Pietro to Bergamo the line used the existing track of the line to Lecco, dating to 1863.

The section between Carnate and Bergamo is used by the regional service of the Milan–Bergamo railway.

See also 
 List of railway lines in Italy

References

Notes

Footnotes

Sources
 
 

Railway lines in Lombardy
Railway lines opened in 1889